Luiz Gastão of Orléans-Braganza (6 June 1938 – 15 July 2022) was the head of the Vassouras branch of the House of Orléans-Braganza and a claimant to the defunct Brazilian throne. The Vassouras branch claims the throne in opposition to the Petrópolis branch of the Orléans-Braganzas, headed by Pedro Carlos Orléans-Braganza. Although Luiz and Pedro Carlos respectively  were and are great-grandchildren of Princess Isabel (daughter of Emperor D. Pedro II), of the House of Braganza, they disputed leadership over the Brazilian Imperial Family due to a dynastic dispute concerning their fathers, who were cousins.

Luiz actively claimed the defunct throne and participated in matters concerning Brazil's imperial past.

Early life 

Luiz Gastão Maria José Pio was born on 6 June 1938 in Mandelieu-la-Napoule, France, as the oldest son of Pedro Henrique of Orléans-Braganza, the Vassouras great-grandson of Emperor Pedro II of Brazil, and his wife, Maria Elisabeth of Bavaria, granddaughter of King Ludwig III of Bavaria.

Prince Luiz was born after the revocation of the exile that had been imposed on the Imperial family by Brazil's first Republican government, the aftermath of World War I and World War II detained the entire family in Europe until 1945, when the Vassouras branch of the family was finally repatriated, settling first in the town of Petrópolis (Rio de Janeiro), then to Jacarezinho (Paraná).

In 1957, Prince Luiz returned to Europe to finish his studies, where he graduated in chemistry at the University of Munich. Returning to Brazil in 1967, his family having already moved to Vassouras (Rio de Janeiro), Luiz became a member of the Society for the Defense of Tradition, Family and Property, a traditionalist Catholic organization which opposes socialistic land reform and supports conservative politics based on Catholic social doctrine and the principles promoted by Plinio Corrêa de Oliveira. Alongside Duarte Pio, Duke of Braganza, his Portuguese counterpart and second cousin, he opposed same-sex marital unions, as of a 2015 declaration.

Succession 
On 1981, he succeeded Prince Pedro Henrique as the claimant to the Brazilian throne in the Vassouras branch. According to Brazilian legitimist claims, he was de jure Emperor of Brazil ("Dom Luiz I of Brazil").

He and two of his younger brothers, Prince Bertrand and Prince Antônio, engaged in monarchist proselytism in Brazil. They played major roles during the campaign for the 1993 plebiscite, which represented the first official opportunity for a return of the monarchy to Brazil since the Proclamation of the Republic in 1889. In it, the people were asked to choose which form of government, presidential or parliamentary, and which form of state organization, republic or constitutional monarchy, Brazil should have. The monarchist cause was not successful, receiving 13.2% of the vote against 66% for the republic.

Dom Luiz resided in a house with "no luxury nor splendor" in Higienópolis, a borough of São Paulo, Brazil.

Death

Prince Luiz died in São Paulo on July 14, 2022 having been hospitalized for a month.  On July 15, 2022, the President of Brazil Jair Bolsonaro and the Minister of Foreign Affairs signed a decree declaring a national day of official mourning for the death of Luiz.

Honours 
As Head of the House of Orléans-Braganza, Prine Luiz Gastão held the following positions:
  Grand Master and Sovereign of the Imperial Order of Christ
  Grand Master and Sovereign of the Imperial Order of Saint Benedict of Aviz
  Grand Master and Sovereign of the Imperial Order of Saint James of the Sword
  Grand Master and Sovereign of the Imperial Order of the Southern Cross
  Grand Master and Sovereign of the Imperial Order of Emperor Pedro I
  Grand Master and Sovereign of the Imperial Order of the Rose

Prince Luiz has also been decorated with a number of other honours:
  Bailiff Grand Cross of the Sacred Military Constantinian Order of Saint George
   Grand Cross of the Order of the Immaculate Conception of Vila Viçosa
  Bailiff Grand Cross of Honour and Devotion of the Sovereign Military Order of Malta
  Knight of the Order of the Holy Sepulchre
  Medal of Honor (Special Class) of the Association of Monarchic Autarchs of Portugal

Ancestry

References

External links
Official website of the Imperial House of Brazil

|-

|-

1938 births
2022 deaths
People from Alpes-Maritimes
Brazilian people of Portuguese descent
Brazilian monarchists
Brazilian traditionalist Catholics
Luiz of Orleans-Braganza, Prince
Luiz of Orleans-Braganza, Prince
Princes Imperial of Brazil
Heads of the Imperial House of Brazil
Ludwig Maximilian University of Munich alumni
Knights Grand Cross of the Order of the Immaculate Conception of Vila Viçosa
Bailiffs Grand Cross of Honour and Devotion of the Sovereign Military Order of Malta
Knights of the Holy Sepulchre
Tradition, Family, Property
People from Vassouras